Alien Blue, stylized as AlienBlue, was an iOS application for browsing Reddit. It was the most popular Reddit client on the App Store at the time. The app featured a wealth of options that tailor the browsing experience to the user. As of May 2016, Alien Blue is no longer available within the App Store on iOS, and has been replaced with Reddit's own application called Reddit: The Official App which is free to download from the Google Play Store and the App Store.

History
Alien Blue's development was started by Jason "Jase" Morrissey shortly after the debut of the App Store. After going through numerous major versions and interface overhauls, the app quickly became the most popular Reddit client on iOS, even beating Reddit's own application, iReddit.

Reddit acquisition
Alien Blue was officially purchased by Reddit on October 15, 2014, to replace their aging application as the new official Reddit client. The app was launched as a separate entry in the App Store with minor UI tweaks and bug fixes, this time listed under the developer "reddit" rather than "Morrissey Exchange Pty." To encourage downloads of the new version, the Pro features (additional functionality unlocked though an in-app purchase), as well as the separate iPad version of the app, were made free for a limited time. After shutting down, all premium users of Alien Blue were gifted 4 free years of Reddit Gold (Reddit's own monthly premium service), set to end around March 2020.

References

Reddit
IOS software
2015 software